The 1979 Soviet Cup Final was a football match that took place at the Lenin's Central Stadium, Moscow on 11 August 1979. The match was the 38th soviet cup final and was contested between Dynamo Moscow and Dinamo Tbilisi. Previous cup holders Dynamo Kyiv were eliminated in Quarter-finals by CSKA Moscow. Dinamo Tbilisi defeated the opponent on penalties and won the cup for the second time.

Road to Final

Previous encounters 

Previously these two teams met each other eight times in the competition with Dynamo from Moscow being victorious five times and Dinamo from Tbilisi three times. Two of these encounters were cup finals, both won by Dynamo Moscow in 1937 and 1970.

Match details

See also
 1979 Soviet Top League

References

External links
 The competition calendar 1
 The competition calendar 2

1979 in Soviet football
Soviet Cup finals
FC Dynamo Moscow matches
FC Dinamo Tbilisi matches
Soviet Cup Final 1979
August 1979 sports events in Europe
1979 in Moscow